Robert McCusker (born January 21, 1935) is a Canadian retired professional hockey player who played 381 games in the Western Hockey League, spending time with the Spokane Comets and Vancouver Canucks.

Awards and honours

References

External links
 

1935 births
Living people
People from the County of St. Paul No. 19
Ice hockey people from Alberta
Spokane Comets players
Vancouver Canucks (WHL) players
Canadian ice hockey left wingers
NCAA men's ice hockey national champions
AHCA Division I men's ice hockey All-Americans